Lead Belly Sings for Children is a compilation album by American folk and blues singer Lead Belly. It was released in 1999 by Smithsonian Folkways.

This collection features songs for young children as well as the work songs, blues, and spirituals Lead Belly used to teach children about the experiences and emotions of adult life. Originally recorded in children's concerts and studios for Moses Asch and Folkways Records in the 1940s.

A dozen of these 28 songs were first issued on the 1960 Folkways album Negro Folk Songs for Young People. The additional tracks were recorded by Moses Asch of Folkways Records from 1941 to 1948, and include five of the six songs released on the 1941 album Party Songs/Sings & Plays. This compilation also includes a previously unreleased radio broadcast of "Take This Hammer".

Track listing

References

1999 compilation albums
Smithsonian Folkways compilation albums
Lead Belly albums